The European Anti-Capitalist Left (EACL) is an informal network for left-wing and anti-capitalist parties in Europe.

The EACL took part in the Europe against Austerity Conference in 2011 and 2012.

Ideology 

Parties participating in the EACL are united in opposition to neo-liberalism and capitalism. The criteria for participation in its conferences are:

 A clear foundation in anti-capitalism, with the goal of achieving socialism.
 Recognition of the pluralist nature of the left, with no claim of a monopoly for their own organisation or viewpoint.
 Pursuit of common action of the left in general coalitions.
 Some degree of representation (in local, regional, or national legislatures) and anchoring in social movements.

Despite the last criterion, many organisations involved in the EACL, with the exception of the founding parties, are somewhat marginal groups, often of Trotskyist or Anti-revisionist Marxist-Leninist persuasion which organize most vigorously through social movements and trade unions, rather than through electoral processes. The EACL emphasises an organizational need to carry out a great deal of extra-parliamentary activism.

Participants 

The following table is a list of participants in each meeting.

See also 
 Criticism of capitalism
 Post-capitalism

References 

Anti-capitalist organizations
Pan-European political parties
Socialist parties in Europe
Eurosceptic parties